Podothrombiidae is a family of mites belonging to the order Trombidiformes.

Genera:
 Podothrombium Berlese

References

Trombidiformes